KPRO may refer to:

 KPRO (FM), a radio station in Altus, Oklahoma, United States
 KPRO (Texas), a defunct radio station (1410 AM) in Marshall, Texas
 KPRO (California), a defunct radio station (1570 AM) in Riverside, California
 KFOO, a radio station (1440 AM) in Riverside, California, that used the KPRO call sign from 1941 to 1986

See also
 Kaypro, an American computer manufacturer of the 1980s
 Boston keratoprosthesis, an artificial cornea